Eric Gordon (born August 22, 1987 in Traverse City, Michigan) is a Canadian football linebacker, last with the Edmonton Eskimos of the Canadian Football League.  He was released by the Edmonton Eskimos on June 3, 2012. He was signed by the Jaguars as an undrafted free agent in 2011. He played college football at Michigan State where he was a four-year starter.  He started 49 of 51 games at linebacker and holds the Michigan State record for the most games as a starter.  He ranks among Michigan State's all-time leaders in tackles for loss, tackles, and sacks.

References

External links
 Jaguars Player Bio

1987 births
Living people
American football linebackers
Canadian football linebackers
Edmonton Elks players
Jacksonville Jaguars players
Michigan State Spartans football players
Players of American football from Michigan
Sportspeople from Traverse City, Michigan